Zion is a quarterly peer-reviewed academic journal covering Jewish history and ethnography, printed in the Hebrew language and published since 1935 by the Historical Society of Israel and the Zalman Shazar Center. The journal was founded by Yitzhak Baer (1888-1980) and Benzion Dinur (1884-1973). Senior Israeli scholars, Michael Toch and Nadav Na'aman, serve as the journal's chief-editors. Back issues are available on JSTOR.

The journal was established in Jerusalem in 1935, but in the years 1926-1934 it appeared under the title Zion: Me’asef. Zion covers all aspects of Jewish history, drawn from all the lands in which Jews lived - in Israel and in the Diaspora, from antiquity to the modern era, including emerging studies in historiography, review essays, and book reviews. Zion is numbered among the academic journals frequently cited by scholars treating on ancient Jewish history.

Abstracting and indexing
The journal is abstracted and indexed in the L'Année philologique, Old Testament Abstracts Online, and Historical Abstracts.

Further reading
 Samuel Ettinger (1985), "`Zion`, and Jewish Historical Research in our own Time," in: Zion (50), pp. 9–15 (Hebrew)

References

External links
 Zion, The Historical Society of Israel
 Zion Quarterly at JSTOR archives

Judaic studies journals
Quarterly journals
Publications established in 1935
Hebrew-language journals
Publications disestablished in 2013
History journals